Some Doves and Pythons is a novel by Sumner Locke Elliott.

References

1966 Australian novels
Harper & Row books